Ali ibn Musa al-Rida (1 January 766 – 6 June 818), also known as Abū al-Ḥasan al-Thānī, was a descendant of the Islamic prophet Muhammad, and the eighth imam in Twelver Shia Islam, succeeding his father, Musa al-Kazim. He is also part of the chain of mystical authority in Sunni Sufi orders. He was known for his piety and learning, and a number of works are attributed to him, including Al-Risala al-Dhahabia, Sahifa al-Rida, and Fiqh al-Rida. Uyun al-Akhbar al-Rida by Ibn Babawayh is a comprehensive collection that includes his religious debates and sayings, biographical details, and even the miracles which have occurred at his tomb. He is buried in Mashad, Iran.

Al-Rida was contemporary with the Abbasid caliphs Harun al-Rashid and his sons, al-Amin and al-Ma'mun. In a sudden departure from the established anti-Shia policy of the Abbasids, possibly to mitigate the frequent Shia revolts, al-Mamun invited al-Rida to Marv in Khorasan, his de facto capital, and designated him as heir apparent, despite the reluctance of the al-Rida who accepted the offer on the condition that he would not interfere in governmental affairs. The appointment of the Ali al-Rida by the Abbasid al-Mamun immediately invoked strong opposition, particularly among the Abbasids and Arab Sunni nationalists, who revolted and installed Ibrahim al-Mubarak, a half-brother of Harun al-Rashid, as the anti-caliph in Baghdad. Realizing the severity of the Iraqi opposition, al-Mamun and his entourage left Khorasan for Baghdad, accompanied by al-Rida. The Imam, however, died mysteriously when the party reached Tus in September 818. His death followed shortly after the assassination of al-Fadl ibn Sahl, the Persian  of al-Mamun, who was publicly seen as responsible for his pro-Shia policies. The caliph is often seen as responsible for both deaths, as he made concessions to the Arab party to smooth his return to Baghdad. Tus was later replaced with a new city, called Mashhad, which developed around the grave of al-Rida as the holiest site in Iran, to which millions of Shia Muslims flock annually for pilgrimage.

Birth and early life

Ali was born in Medina in 765 (148 AH), 768 (151 AH), or 770 (153 AH). The first date is said to be based on a prediction ascribed to his grandfather, al-Sadiq, who died in that year, that the successor to his son al-Kazim would be born soon. There are some indications that Ali might have been born as late 159 AH. In any case, the date often given by Shia authorities is 11 Du al-Qa'da 148 AH.  His father was al-Kazim, the seventh Twelver Shia Imam, who was a descendant of Ali and Fatima, cousin and daughter of the Islamic prophet, respectively. His mother was a freed slave, probably of Berber origin, whose name is recorded differently in various sources, perhaps Najma or Toktam. It was reputedly Hamida Khatun, mother of al-Kazim, who chose Najma for him. Momen writes that Ali was thirty-five years old when his father died, whereas Donaldson holds that he was twenty or twenty-five at the time.

Designation as Imam
Al-Kazim designated his son, Ali al-Rida, as his successor before his death in Harun al-Rashid's prison in 799 (183 AH), following some years of imprisonment. Madelung adds that a-Kazim had made al-Rida his legatee, and that al-Rida also inherited his father's estate near Medina to the exclusion of his brothers. After al-Kazim, al-Rida was thus acknowledged as the next Imam by a significant group of al-Kazim's followers, who formed the main line of Shia and went on to become the Twelvers. The brothers of al-Rida did not claim the imamate but a number of them revolted against the Abbasids. Some of the followers of al-Kazim, however, claimed that he had not died and would return as Mahdi, the promised savior in Islam. These became known as the Waqifiyya though it appears that they later returned to the mainstream Shia, declaring al-Rida and his successors as the lieutenants of al-Kazim. These also included the Bushariyya, named after Muhammad ibn Bashir, the gnostic from Kufa, who claimed to be the interim imam in the absence of al-Kazim. The term Waqifiyya is applied generally to any group who denies or hesitates over the death of a particular Shia Imam and refuses to recognize his successors.

According to Kohlberg, the creation of Waqifiyya might have had a financial reason. Some of the representatives of al-Kazim evidently refused to hand over to al-Rida the monies entrusted to them, arguing that al-Kazim was the last Imam. These included Mansur ibn Yunus Buzurg and Ali ibn Abi Ḥamza al-Bataini, Ziyad ibn Marwan al-Kandi, Uthman ibn Isa al-Amiri al-Ruasi (Ruwasi). Some reports indicate that al-Ruasi repented.

Imamate
The imamate of al-Rida overlapped with the reigns of the Abbasid Harun al-Rashid and his sons, al-Amin and al-Mamun. He initially adopted a quiescent attitude and kept aloof from politics, similar to his predecessors, namely, the fourth through seventh Shia Imams. Al-Rida, known for his piety and learning, issued s (legal rulings) at The Prophet's Mosque in Medina when he was still in his twenties and narrated hadith from his forefathers. Throughout the years, several of his brothers and his uncle Moḥammad ibn Ja'far participated in the Alid revolts in Iraq and Arabia, but al-Rida refused any involvement. In this period, al-Rida's only involvement in politics might have been to mediate between the Abbasid government and his uncle Muḥammad ibn Ja'far, who had revolted in Mecca.

Civil war and unrest 
The Abbasid Harun died during the imamate of al-Rida and the empire was split between his two sons: the reigning caliph, al-Amin, who was born to an Arab mother, and al-Mamun, who was born of a Persian mother and was designated as the successor and the governor of the province of Khorasan in present-day Iran. In effect, according to Momen, al-Amin controlled Iraq and the west with his Arab , al-Fadl ibn Rabi, while al-Mamun controlled Iran and the east with his Persian , al-Fadl ibn Sahl. Al-Amin reportedly violated these arrangements by appointing his son as successor in place of Mamun, and soon a civil war ensued in which al-Amin was killed and Baghdad was occupied by al-Mamun's general, who nevertheless remained in Marv in Kuharasan, apparently determined to make there his new capital. Al-Mamun claimed for himself the title of Imam al-Huda, possibly to imply that he was best qualified for the caliphate. Notably, he faced costly revolts in Kufa and Arabia by Alids and Zaydis, who intensified their campaign against the Abbasids around 815, seizing the cities of Mecca, Medina, Wasit, and Basra. In particular, the Shia revolt by Abu'l-Saraya in 815 was difficult to suppress in Iraq, and compelled al-Hasan ibn Sahl, al-Mamun's governor of Iraq, to deploy the troops of the Khorasani general Harthama.

Appointment as heir apparent (817 CE) 

Departing from the established anti-Shia policies of his predecessors, al-Mamun invited al-Rida to Khorasan in 816, and designated him as successor in 817. According to Madelung, al-Mamun wrote to al-Rida in 200 AH (815-816), invited him to come to Marv, and also sent Raja ibn Abi'l Zahhak, cousin of his , and a eunuch to accompany al-Rida on this trip. In the same year, al-Rida might have also made the pilgrimage to Mecca with his five-year-old son Moḥammad al-Jawad. After some initial resistance, al-Rida set out for Marv in 816. Though he did not pass through Qum on his way to Marv, he stayed for some time in Nishapur, where prominent Sunni traditionists visited him, including Ibn Rahuya, Yahya ibn Yahya, Moḥammad ibn Rafe', and Ahmad ibn Ḥarb. Al-Rida continued on to Marv after receiving a new summons from al-Mamun.

In Marv, al-Mamun first offered al-Rida the caliphate, though this was turned down by the latter. According to Madelung, al-Rida resisted al-Mamun's proposals for about two months until he reluctantly consented to an appointment as heir to the caliphate. The sources seem to agree that al-Rida was reluctant to accept this nomination, ceding only to the insistence of the caliph, with the condition that he would not interfere in governmental affairs or the appointment or dismissal of government agents. The title al-Rida was reputedly bestowed upon him by the caliph, in a reference to a descendant of Muhammad upon whom Muslims would agree for the caliphate, a rallying cry of the Shia and, earlier, of Abbasids against the Umayyads. On 2 Ramadan 201 (23 March 817) by one account, the dignitaries and army leaders in Marv pledged their allegiance to the new heir apparent, who was dressed in green. An official announcement was made in the mosques throughout the empire, coins were minted to commemorate the occasion, and al-Mamun also changed the color of uniforms, official dress, and flags from black, the official Abbasid color, to green. This move possibly signified the reconciliation between the Abbasids and the Alids. To strengthen their relations, al-Mamun also married his daughter to al-Rida and promised another daughter to al-Rida's son in Medina, a minor at the time.

Motives 
The motivations of al-Mamun for this appointment are not fully understood. At the time, he justified his decision by maintaining that al-Rida was the most suitable person for the caliphate. The reluctance of al-Rida in accepting this designation, however, might reflect his suspicion that al-Mamun had ulterior motives. With an age gap of more than twenty years, it also seems unlikely that al-Rida would ever have succeeded the much younger al-Mamun. With this appointment, some have suggested that al-Mamun hoped for the support of the Shia and respite from their numerous revolts. Others have suggested that al-Mamun was influenced by his powerful Persian , af-Fadl ibn Sahl, who had Shia tendencies. Madelung, however, finds it more likely that the initiative to appoint al-Rida belonged to al-Mamun and not his . Some authors have not found the appointment surprising, noting the strained or severed relations of the caliph with his Abbasid relatives. Yet others have written that al-Mamun wanted a merit-based caliphate, though he made no mention of rules governing the succession to al-Rida during the ceremony. It has been suggested that al-Mamun might have wanted to heal the Sunni-Shia division, while Lapidus and others hold that al-Mamun wanted to expand his authority by adopting the Shia views about the divine authority of religious leaders, alongside his later religious inquisition. Bayhom-Daou considers it likely that al-Mamun saw this appointment as a means of discrediting the Shia doctrine of Imamate, and Tabatabai writes that al-Mamun might have also hoped to undermine the position of al-Rida as a Shia religious leader by engaging him in politics.

Al-Rida's rejection of al-Mamun's initial offer for replacing him as the caliph has been used to argue that al-Rida's ultimate aim was not temporal and political power. Rather, Mavani suggests that such power was merely a means for the Imam to reach the ultimate goal of guiding the community to salvation. When al-Rida was asked why he accepted the successorship, he is reported to have emphasized his unwillingness, responding, "The same thing which forced my grandfather the Commander of the Faithful [Ali ibn Abi Talib] to join the arbitration council [i.e., coercion]." It also appears that this appointment did not alienate any of the followers of al-Rida which, according to Bayhom-Daou, might imply that they were convinced that he was a reluctant player who had no choice but to accept his designation as the heir apparent.

Reactions 
Perhaps incorrectly, the appointment of al-Rida was at the time largely attributed to the influence of al-Mamun's Persian , al-Fadl ibn Sahl. Nevertheless, various Abbasid governors, with the exception of Ismail ibn Jafar in Basra, loyally carried out their orders and exacted the oath of allegiance to the new heir. The appointment of the Alid al-Rida by the Abbasid al-Mamun apparently brought him the support of several notable Alids and nearly all the Zaydite partisans. It also immediately invoked strong opposition, particularly among the Abbasids and Arab Sunni nationalists. Al-Mamun's decision did not carry the public opinion of the Iraqis, who declared him deposed and installed Ibrahim ibn al-Mahdi, another Abbasid, as caliph in 817, while the popular militia roamed through Baghdad, demanding a return to the Quran and the Sunna. Ibrahim, a half-brother of al-Mamun's father, is said to have been a weak statesman and a mere figurehead, whose rule was largely confined to Baghdad. There were also military engagements in Baghdad, Kufa, and Wasit between al-Mamun's forces and the supporters of Ibrahim who were themselves much harassed by financial and logistical difficulties.

Tenure as heir apparent (817-818 CE) 
Al-Rida was given a high status at the court of al-Mamun. While the caliph evidently desired that al-Rida should immediately engage in all official ceremonies, the latter is reported to have refrained, stipulating that he would not participate in government affairs. Al-Rida was given his own police force and guard, as well as a chamberlain and a secretary. The caliph is said to have relied on the judgment of al-Rida in religious questions and arranged for debates between him and scholars of Islam and other faiths. According to Rizvi, however, these religious disputations seem to have been designed as set pieces to embarrass al-Rida. Their accounts were later recorded by Ibn Babuwayh in his Uyun akhbar al-Rida.

Return to Baghdad (818 CE) 
The seriousness of the civil unrest in Iraq was apparently kept hidden from al-Mamun by his  until 818, and it was al-Rida who urged the caliph to return to Baghdad and restore peace. Al-Rida's assessment was supported by several army chiefs and al-Mamun thus left Khorasan in 818. Before their return, his  offered his resignation, pointing out the hatred of the Abbasids in Baghdad for him personally, and requested the caliph to leave him as governor in Khorasan. Those responsible were soon executed, but not before declaring that they had been acting on the orders of the caliph.

Death and burial 

Al-Rida died in Tus (present-day Mashhad) on the last day of Safar 203 (September 818), possibly poisoned. Other given dates range from Safar 202 (September 817) to Dhu al-Qa'da 203 (May 819). The sources seem to agree that al-Rida died after a short illness as he accompanied al-Mamun and his entourage back to Baghdad. His death followed shortly after the assassination of al-Fadl ibn Sahl, the Persian  of al-Mamun, who had become a divisive figure. Both deaths are attributed in Shia sources to al-Mamun as he made concessions to the Arab party to smooth his return to Iraq. This opinion is echoed by Kennedy and Bobrick, and Bayhom-Daou considers this the prevalent view among Western historians. Similarly, Rizvi writes that the sudden reversal of al-Mamun’s pro-Shia policies and his attempt to eradicate the memory of al-Rida might support the accusations against the caliph. In contrast, the Sunni historians al-Tabari and al-Masudi, who both lived under the Abbasids, do not consider the possibility of murder. In particular, al-Masudi writes that al-Rida died as a result of consuming too many grapes. Alternatively, the Shia scholar Tabatabai believes that al-Mamun poisoned al-Rida in view of the growing popularity of the latter and the immediate proliferation of the Shia teachings. Some Sunni authors seem to have also adopted the Shia practice of referring to al-Rida's death as martyrdom.

The caliph then asked a group of Alids to examine the body of al-Rida and testify that he had died of natural causes. At the funeral, al-Mamun recited the last prayers himself, and the reports note his display of grief during the funeral. Madelung does not view these emotions as necessarily insincere, noting that on other occasions in the reign of al-Mamun, cold political calculation appears to have outweighed the personal sentiments and ideals. A year later, in Safar 204 (August 819), the caliph entered Baghdad without a fight. The anti-caliph, Ibrahim ibn al-Mahdi, had already fled from the city several weeks earlier. The return to Baghdad marked the end of the pro-Shia policies of al-Mamun, and was followed by the return to the traditional black color of the Abbasids.

Shrine 
Al-Mamun buried al-Rida in Tus next to his father, Harun al-Rashid. Tus was later replaced with a new city, called Mashhad, developed around the grave of al-Rida as the holiest site in Iran for the Shia. The present shrine dates to the fourteenth century when the Mongol Sultan Muhammad Oljeitu converted to Shi'ism. Most of the elaborate decorative work in the present imposing complex dates from Safavid and Qajar times. Adjacent to the shrine is the Goharshad Mosque, one of the finest in Iran, named after the wife of the Timurid Shah Rukh and completed in 1394 CE. A number of theological colleges have been built around the shrine, the most famous of which is that of Mirza Ja'far Khan.

Rituals 
The traditional ritual of Khutbeh Khani is held annually on the night of al-Rida's death. The ritual, dating back to governor Ali Shah of Khorasan in 1160 AH, involves the servants of the holy site walking from the nearest street to Inqilab yard with candles in their hands. There, they stand around the yard and the crowd recites religious sermons and praise God. This ritual is also repeated on the night of Ashura.

Succession 
Muhammad, the only child of al-Rida, was seven years old when his father died. The succession of the young Muhammad, who later became known as al-Jawad, became controversial among the followers of his father. A group of them instead accepted the imamate of al-Rida's brother, Ahmad ibn Musa. Another group joined the Waqifiyya, who considered al-Kazim to be the last Imam and expected his return as Mahdi. Some had opportunistically backed the imamate of al-Rida after his appointment as successor to the caliphate and now returned to their Sunni or Zaydi communities. Tabatabai, however, regards the divisions in Shia after al-Rida as insignificant and often temporary. Twelver scholars have noted that Jesus received his prophetic mission in the Quran when he was still a child, and some hold that al-Jawad had received the requisite perfect knowledge of all religious matters through divine inspiration from the time of his succession, irrespective of his age.

Titles and family 
Al-Rida is also known as Abu al-Hasan al-Thani to distinguish him from his father, Musa al-Kazim, who is also known as Abu al-Hasan al-Awwal. In a move to strengthen their ties, al-Mamun had married his daughter, Umm Habib, to al-Rida, though no children resulted from that marriage. Muhammad, who later became known as al-Jawad, was the only child of al-Rida, born to Sabika (or Khayzuran), a freed slave from Nubia, who was said to have descended from the family of Maria al-Qibtiyya, a freed slave of the prophet and mother of his son Ebrahim, who died in childhood.

Views 
In addition to Shia authorities, Sunni biographical sources also list al-Rida as one of the narrators of prophetic hadiths, and al-Waqidi considers him a reliable transmitter. As a Shia Imam who rejected the authority of Muhammad's companions as hadith transmitters, initially only the Shia transmitted hadith on the authority of al-Rida. In his later years, however, notable Sunni traditionists were said to have visited him, including Ibn Rahwayh and Yahya ibn Yahya. In particular, his appointment as the heir apparent seemed to have added to the credibility to al-Rida in Sunni circles, who at the time apparently came to regard him as a distinguished transmitter by virtue of his learning and descent from the prophet. In view of his continued veneration as a Shia Imam, later Sunni authors were divided about the authority of al-Rida, some saying that he was not always a reliable transmitter and others instead questioning the authority of those who transmitted from al-Rida. They all seem to refer to him as a man of piety and learning.

It has been commonly held that Ma'ruf al-Karkhi, who converted to Islam at the hands of al-Rida, is a prominent figure in the golden chain of most Sufi orders. He is said to have been a devoted student of al-Rida, though Bayhom-Daou regards the accounts of their encounters as apocryphal. In Sufi tradition, al-Rida is regarded as a model of asceticism, and the chains of authority in Shia Sufi orders progress through al-Rida, followed by al-Karkhi. One such instance is the Ni'mat Allahi order.

Works
Al-Risala al-Dhahabia is a treatise on medical cures and the maintenance of good health which was reputedly commissioned by al-Mamun, who requested it in gold ink, hence the name. The studies by Speziale (2004) and Speziale - Giurini (2009) have critically analysed the issue of the authorship of the text. The book was text edited in Bombay and included by Majlesi in his Bihar al-Anwar. A number of commentaries have been written to it and it has been translated into Persian and Urdu. Despite questions concerning its authenticity, the book remains popular among the Twelver Shia.

Sahifa al-Rida is a collection of 240 hadiths, mentioned in some early Twelver sources and ascribed to al-Rida. Fiqh al-Rida, also called al-Fiqh al-Radawi, is a treatise on jurisprudence attributed to al-Rida. It was not known till the tenth century (sixteenth CE century) when it was judged to be authentic by Majlesi but later Twelver scholars have doubted its authenticity, including S.H. Sadr. Other works attributed to al-Rida are listed in A'yan al-Shia. Additionally, Shia sources contain detailed descriptions of his religious debates, sayings, and poetry. Uyun al-Akhbar al-Rida by Ibn Babawayh is a comprehensive collection that includes the religious debates, sayings, biographical details, and even the miracles which have occurred at his tomb.

Debates 
Al-Mamun showed interest in theological questions and organized debates between the scholars of different sects and religions in which al-Rida participated. One of these debates was about Divine Unity, led by Sulaiman al-Mervi, a scholar from Khorasan. Another discussion with Ali ibn Muhammad ibn al-Jahm was devoted to the infallibility of the prophets, which led to another session on the same subject when al-Mamun took part in the debate himself. Many of these debates are recorded in the collections of Shia hadiths, such as Uyun Akhbar al-Rida. The following is an excerpt from a debate between al-Rida and an unbeliever.

All that we have prayed, fasted, given the alms and declared our convictions will not harm us. If the correct view is our view then have not you perished and we gained salvation?"
 The man said, "Then let me know, how is He and where is He?" Al-Rida answered, "Surely the opinion thou hast adopted is mistaken. He determined the 'where', and He was, when there was no 'where'; and He fashioned the 'how', and He was, when there was no 'how'. So He is not known through 'howness' or 'whereness.'"
 The man said, "So then surely He is nothing if He cannot be perceived by any of the senses." Al-Rida responded, "When our senses fail to perceive Him, we know for certain that He is our Lord and that He is something different from other things."
 The man said, "Then tell me, when was He?" Al-Rida said, "Tell when He was not, and then I will tell you when He was." 
 The man said, "Then what is the proof of Him?" Al-Rida responded, "Surely when I contemplate my body and it is impossible for me to increase or decrease its breadth and height, or to keep unpleasant things away from it or draw benefits to it, then I know that this structure has a maker and I acknowledge Him-even though that which I had seen of the rotation of the celestial sphere through His power; the producing of clouds; the turning about of the winds; the procession of the sun, the moon and the stars; and others of His wondrous and perfectly created signs, had (already) made me know that (all) this has a Determiner and Producer."
 The man said, "Then why has He veiled Himself (from men)?" Al-Rida replied, "Surely the veil is upon creatures because of the abundance of their sins. As for Him, no secret is hidden from Him during the day or the night." The debate continued and this episode ended with the  professing Islam.

Character 
Al-Rida is represented in historical sources as a thoughtful and likable man. Donaldson includes the account of Reyyan ibn Salt who, when bidding farewell to his Imam, was so overcome with grief that he forgot to ask al-Rida for one of his shirts, to use as a shroud, and some coins, to make rings for his daughters. As Reyyan was leaving, however, al-Rida called to him, "Do you not want one of my shirts to keep as your shroud? And would you not like some pieces of money for rings for your daughters?" Reyyan left after al-Rida fulfilled his wishes. Byzanti relates that when he visited al-Rida for a few hours, al-Rida invited him to stay for the night and spread his own bed for Byzanti. Muhammad ibn Ghaffar narrates that when he visited al-Rida to ask for financial help, al-Rida fulfilled his wish before he mentioned his need and then invited Muhammad to stay overnight as his guest.

Selected quotes 

 "The sincere friend of every man is his intelligence, while his enemy is his ignorance."
 "Worship is not abundant prayer and fasting; rather it is abundant reflecting on the affair of Allah, the Great and Almighty."
 "Man is not worshipful unless he is clement."
 "Faith is a degree above Islam; fear of Allah is a degree above faith; and nothing less than fear of Allah has been divided among men."
 "Faith is four pillars: trust in Allah, satisfaction with Allah's decree, submission to Allah's command, and entrusting (affairs) to Allah."
 "If one lacks five attributes, do not expect to gain anything good out of him for your life in this world or your life to come: if his lineage is known to be untrustworthy, if his nature lacks generosity, if his temper lacks balance, if he lacks a noble conduct, and if he lacks fear of his Lord."
 "If only three years of a person's span of life has remained and he tightens the bond of kin, Allah will make them thirty years, and Allah does whatever He wills."
 "Adhere to the weapon of the prophets!" They asked, "What is the weapon of prophets?" He replied, "Supplication."
 "A believer's secret supplication is equal to seventy open supplications."
 "Imamate is compulsory for religion and it is a system for Muslims. It is cause of benefit in this world and dignity for Believers."

See also

 Al-Fadl ibn Shadhan of Nishapur
 Waqifite Shia
 Reign of Love (TV series)
 Hajar Khatoon Mosque
 The Twelve Imams
 Hadith of Golden Chain
 Al-Risala al-Dhahabia
 Al-Sahifa al-Rida

References

Sources 
 
 Fabrizio Speziale, “La Risāla al-dahabiyya, traité médical attribué à l'imām ‘Alī al-Riżā’”. Luqman. Annales des Presses Universitaires d'Iran, vol. XX, n. 2 (40), 2004 (2005), pp. 7-34, [ISSN 0259-904X]
 Fabrizio Speziale - Giorgio Giurini, 2009, Il Trattato aureo sulla medicina attribuito a l’imām ‘Alī al-Riḍā, Palermo, Officina di Studi Medievali (series Machina Philosophorum).

External links

 Astan Quds Ravazi
 The eighth Imam Ali Ibn Musa, al-Reza
 Imam Ali ar-Rida
 Imam Ali Raza
 A glance at the biography of Emam Reza
 Imam Rida shrine – Live Broadcast
 

 
765 births
818 deaths
8th-century Arabs
8th-century imams
8th-century people from the Abbasid Caliphate
9th-century Arabs
9th-century imams
9th-century people from the Abbasid Caliphate
Assassinated Shia imams
Deaths by poisoning
Fourth Fitna
Twelve Imams
Zaydi imams
Physicians from the Abbasid Caliphate
Husaynids
Burials in Mashhad
Burials at Imam Reza Shrine